CAVEman is a 4D high-resolution model of a functioning human elaborated by University of Calgary. It resides in a cube-shaped virtual reality room, like a cave, also known as the "research holodeck", in which the human model floats in space, projected from three walls and the floor below.

References

External links
 University of Calgary Unveils the CAVEman Virtual Human
 CAVEman unveiled
 Meet the CAVEman of the future

Health informatics
Holography